The Museum of Everything is a BBC Radio 4 comedy sketch show, written by and starring Marcus Brigstocke, Danny Robins and Dan Tetsell, based on their earlier live sketch show of the same name. The live show was performed at the Edinburgh Festival Fringe in 2002. Robins created the radio show; the first series was broadcast in 2004, a second series in 2005 and a third series in 2006. It is built around the theme of museums, galleries, stately homes and more, set in an English provincial museum with a very wide array of exhibits. Lucy Montgomery also features. The programme is produced by Alex Walsh-Taylor and the music is written by Dominic Haslam and Ben Walker.

Episodes

Series 1
Welcome to the Museum of Everything
A Very Important Visitor
School Parties Welcome
To Infinity and Beyond
The History of Everything
The History of the Future

Series 2
The Museum Reopens
The Dig
Under New Management
The Coach Trip
By Royal Appointment
Behind the Magic

Series 3
The Museum Reopens
Natural Science
The Thing
And The Winner Is…
The Expo
Transport

References

External links
Legacy archived BBC Museum of Everything Homepage
Official BBC Episode Guide for Museum of Everything

Museum of Everything
Museum of Everything
Museum of Everything, The